Hassan Khan (born 1975) is a British-born Egyptian multimedia artist, musician, and writer who works with choreography, music, performance, sound, and video to create narratives. 
He resides and works in Cairo.

He received a BA and an MA in English and comparative literature from the American University in Cairo.

In 2017 Khan won the Silver Lion for the "most promising young artist in the central exhibition" at the 57th Venice Biennale for his piece "Composition for a Public Park (Music composed and recorded by the artist, text written and recorded in various voices by the artist, computer and multi-track software, audio interface, multichannel sound system, public park)".

Khan created the exhibition "keys top the Kingdom" organized the Reina Sofia in Madrid, Spain which ran at the Palacio de Cristal in Retiro Park from October 18, 2019  to March 1, 2020.

References

Egyptian artists
1975 births
Living people
Egyptian musicians